This is a timeline of Microsoft, a multinational computer technology corporation.

Full timeline

References

Microsoft
Microsoft
History of Microsoft